Dalal may refer to:

 Dalal, alternative name for the black grasswren of Western Australia
 Dalal (name), Arabic and Indian name
 Dalal Street, downtown Mumbai, India
 Dalal (clan); see Mandothi

See also
  Includes persons with the forename or surname Dalal
 Dalaal
 Jalal